The southern shrikebill (Clytorhynchus pachycephaloides), or brown flycatcher, is a songbird species in the family Monarchidae. It is found in New Caledonia and Vanuatu. Its natural habitat is subtropical or tropical moist lowland forests.

Subspecies
Two subspecies are recognized:
 C. p. pachycephaloides - Elliot, 1870: Found on New Caledonia
 C. p. grisescens - Sharpe, 1899: Originally described as a separate species. Found on Banks Islands (Vanuatu)

References

Clytorhynchus
Birds described in 1870
Taxonomy articles created by Polbot